The 3rd Cavalry Division "Principe Amedeo Duca d'Aosta" was a Cavalry or "Celere" (Fast) division of the Royal Italian Army during World War II. The division was formed in 1934, and during World War II was mobilized in June 1940. As a cavalry division it took part in the Invasion of Yugoslavia and was part of the Italian Expeditionary Corps in Russia. Annihilated during the Red Army's Operation Little Saturn in December 1942, the survivors returned to Italy in spring 1943.

History 
The division was formed on 1 November 1934 as 3rd Cavalry Division "Principe Amedeo Duca d'Aosta" in Milan. Although not officially sanctioned the division is considered to be the heir of the 3rd Cavalry Division of Lombardy, which fought in World War I and consisted of the V and VI cavalry brigades and was based in Milan. The division consisted of the III Cavalry Brigade "Principe Amedeo Duca d'Aosta" and the 3rd Cavalry Artillery Regiment. The cavalry brigade consisted of the cavalry regiments Regiment "Savoia Cavalleria" (3rd) and Regiment "Lancieri di Novara" (5th), the 8th Bersaglieri Regiment, and the III Light Tank Group "San Giorgio". On 1 February 1938 the III Cavalry Brigade "Principe Amedeo Duca d'Aosta" was dissolved and its units came under direct command of the division.

World War II 
In March 1941 the division had to transfer its 3rd Fast Artillery Regiment with the II and III motorized groups to Libya, where they were used to reform the 17th Infantry Division "Pavia"'s 26th Artillery Regiment, which had been destroyed by British forces during the Battle of Beda Fomm on 6-7 February 1941. The division participated in the Invasion of Yugoslavia and returned to Milan on 31 May 1941. There the division received on 23 June the two remaining artillery groups of its two sister divisions 1st Cavalry Division "Eugenio di Savoia" and 2nd Cavalry Division "Emanuele Filiberto Testa di Ferro", which allowed the "Principe Amedeo Duca d'Aosta" to raise the 3rd Horse Artillery Regiment for the division's upcoming deployment to the Eastern front.

Eastern Front 
On 13 August 1941 the division reached Dniprodzerzhynsk (today Kamianske on the Dnieper river in central Ukraine, where the division took up position to the right of the 9th Infantry Division "Pasubio". On 28 September the Pasubio forced the river and the division's of the Italian Expeditionary Corps in Russia went on the offensive, which brought them to Stalino (today Donetsk) by 13 October. After a month of fierce combat Stalino and nearby Horlivka were taken. The divisions continued their slowing offensive until 25th December, when the Soviets launched a determined counterattack in the Christmas Battle. The Italians repulsed the attack and the front stabilized afterwards for January.

On 15 March 1942 the division was radically reorganized: it received the 6th Bersaglieri Regiment from the 2nd Cavalry Division "Emanuele Filiberto Testa di Ferro", the 120th Motorized Artillery Regiment, the LXVII Armored Bersaglieri Battalion (two companies of L6/40 light tanks), the IX Mortar Battalion, the XIII Squadrons Group/ Regiment "Cavalleggeri di Alessandria" (14th), with two squadrons of Semovente 47/32 self-propelled guns, and an expanded complement of mortars and anti-tank weapons. The division's two cavalry regiments, the horse artillery regiment and the III Light Tanks Group "San Giorgio" were removed from the division and formed the independent Horse Troops Grouping under direct command of the 8th Italian Army. With the new units and equipment the 3rd Cavalry Division was now structured similar to Italian motorized divisions.

In April 1942, the division was further reinforced when the Croatian Light Transport Brigade arrived at the front and was attached to the "Principe Amedeo Duca d'Aosta". From 30 July to 9 August the two Bersaglieri regiments eliminated the Soviet bridgehead at Serafimovich and later that month, with the support of German tanks, the Bersaglieri repelled a Soviet attack during the first defensive battle of the Don.

By late autumn 1942, the 8th Italian Army was placed on the left flank of the German 6th Army between the Hungarian and Romanian forces. The German 6th Army was then investing Soviet General Vasily Chuikov's 62nd Army in Stalingrad.

Operation Little Saturn 
On 17 December the Soviets began Operation Little Saturn and under immense pressure of superior Soviet armored forces the Italian divisions had to retreat from the Don the next day, but the motorized Soviet formations overtook the Italians and therefore repeatedly the Italians had to fight their way through Soviet defensive lines on their way towards Poltava and Dnipropetrovsk. After three weeks in the icy desert of the Steppe the survivors crossed the Donets river. The few remaining troops formed a Kampfgruppe and continued to fight until February 1943. The last troops were withdrawn to Italy in March 1943 and garrisoned in Bologna and Imola, where the process of rebuilding the division began.

After the announcement of the Armistice of Cassibile on 8 September 1943 the division and its units were disbanded on 15 September 1943 after brief resistance against the invading German forces.

Organization

August 1940 
The division had undergone a level of mechanization and fielded two cavalry regiments, a Bersaglieri regiment, a motorized artillery regiment, and a light tank group. The squadrons of the cavalry regiments were horse-mounted and, other than a motorcycle company, the Bersaglieri were issued with bicycles. The light tank group had a total of 61 L3/35s and L6/40 tanks.

  3rd Cavalry Division "Principe Amedeo Duca d'Aosta", in Milan
 Regiment "Savoia Cavalleria" (3rd), in Milan
 Command Squadron
 I Squadrons Group
 II Squadrons Group
 5th Machine Gun Squadron
 Regiment "Lancieri di Novara" (5th), in Verona
 Command Squadron
 I Squadrons Group
 II Squadrons Group
 5th Machine Gun Squadron
 3rd Bersaglieri Regiment, in Milan
 Command Company
 XVIII Bersaglieri Battalion
 XX Bersaglieri Battalion
 XXV Bersaglieri Battalion
 2nd Bersaglieri Motorcyclists Company (detached from the 2nd Bersaglieri Regiment)
 3rd Bersaglieri Motorcyclists Company
 3rd Anti-tank Company (47/32 anti-tank guns)
 3rd Fast Artillery Regiment "Principe Amedeo Duca d'Aosta", in Milan (replaced by the 3rd Horse Artillery Regiment for the campaign in the Soviet Union)
 Command Unit
 I Group (75/27 Mod. 12 horse-drawn guns)
 II Motorized Group (75/27 Mod. 12 guns)
 III Motorized Group (75/27 Mod. 12 guns)
 93rd Anti-aircraft Battery (20/65 Mod. 35 anti-aircraft guns)
 101st Anti-aircraft Battery (20/65 Mod. 35 anti-aircraft guns)
 Ammunition and Supply Unit
 III Light Tank Group "San Giorgio", in Verona (L3/35 and L6/40 tanks)
 IX Mortar Battalion (81mm Mod. 35 mortars)
 172nd Anti-tank Company (47/32 anti-tank guns, detached from the 2nd Cavalry Division "Emanuele Filiberto Testa di Ferro")
 173rd Anti-tank Company (47/32 anti-tank guns)
 103rd Telegraph and Radio Operators Company
 105th Engineer Company
 73rd Medical Section
 46th Field Hospital
 47th Field Hospital
 148th Field Hospital
 159th Field Hospital (detached from the 2nd Cavalry Division "Emanuele Filiberto Testa di Ferro")
 30th Surgical Unit
 213th Transport Section
 36th Transport Platoon
 872nd Transport Platoon
 873rd Transport Platoon
 874th Transport Platoon
 93rd Supply Section
 59th Bakers Section
 3rd Cavalry Division Command Transport Squad
 355th Carabinieri Section
 356th Carabinieri Section
 40th Field Post Office

Attached during the Invasion of Yugoslavia in 1941:
 Regiment "Genova Cavalleria" (4th)
 Command Squadron
 I Squadrons Group
 II Squadrons Group
 5th Machine Gun Squadron

August 1942 
After the reorganization in August 1942 the division consisted of the following units:

  3rd Cavalry Division "Principe Amedeo Duca d'Aosta"
 3rd Bersaglieri Regiment
 Command Company
 XVIII Auto-transported Bersaglieri Battalion
 XX Auto-transported Bersaglieri Battalion
 XXV Auto-transported Bersaglieri Battalion
 3rd Anti-tank Company (47/32 anti-tank guns)
 6th Bersaglieri Regiment
 Command Company
 VI Auto-transported Bersaglieri Battalion
 XIII Auto-transported Bersaglieri Battalion
 XIX Auto-transported Bersaglieri Battalion
 6th Anti-tank Company (47/32 anti-tank guns)
 120th Motorized Artillery Regiment
 Command Unit
 I Motorized Group (100/17 howitzers)
 II Motorized Group (75/27 field guns)
 III Motorized Group (75/27 field guns)
 93rd Anti-aircraft Battery (20/65 Mod. 35 anti-aircraft guns)
 101st Anti-aircraft Battery (20/65 Mod. anti-aircraft guns)
 IC Mortar Battalion (81mm Mod. 35 mortars)
 XIII Self-propelled Anti-tank Squadrons Group "Cavalleggeri di Alessandria" (47/32 L40 self-propelled guns)
 XLVII Bersaglieri Motorcyclists Battalion
 LXVII Armored Bersaglieri Battalion (L6/40 tanks)
 Anti-tank Battalion
 75th Anti-tank Battery (75/39 anti-tank guns)
 172nd Anti-tank Company (47/32 anti-tank guns)
 173rd Anti-tank Company (47/32 anti-tank guns)
 272nd Anti-tank Company (47/32 anti-tank guns)
 103rd Telegraph and Radio Operators Company
 105th Engineer Company
 XIV Transport Group
 122nd Light Transport Section
 213th Medium Transport Section
 218th Heavy Transport Section
 219th Heavy Transport Section
 73rd Medical Section
 46th Field Hospital
 47th Field Hospital
 148th Field Hospital
 30th Surgical Unit
 93rd Supply Section
 3rd Cavalry Division Command Transport Squad
 355th Carabinieri Section
 356th Carabinieri Section
 40th Field Post Office

Military honors 
For their conduct during the campaign in the Soviet Union the President of Italy awarded the division's units six Gold Medals of Military Valour - Italy's highest military honor. This makes the 3rd Cavalry Division "Principe Amedeo Duca d'Aosta" together with the 3rd Alpine Division "Julia" the two highest decorated Italian divisions of World War II.

  3rd Bersaglieri Regiment on 31 December 1947
  3rd Bersaglieri Regiment on 30 January 1948
  Regiment "Savoia Cavalleria" (3rd) on 13 December 1948
  Regiment "Lancieri di Novara" (5th) on 13 December 1948
  6th Bersaglieri Regiment on 26 May 1956
  6th Bersaglieri Regiment on 13 December 1958

Commanding officers 
The division's commanding officers were:

 Generale di Divisione Francesco Guidi (20 September 1934 - 12 November 1935)
 Generale di Divisione Sebastiano Murari della Corte Brà (13 November 1935 - ?)
 Generale di Divisione Mario Berti (? - 31 March 1938)
 Generale di Divisione Giovanni Messe (1 April 1938 - 16 May 1940)
 Generale di Divisione Mario Marazzani (10 June 1940 - 1 November 1942)
 Generale di Divisione Ettore de Blasio (3 November 1942 - 15 September 1943)

References

Further reading 
 Dr Jeffrey T. Fowler - Axis Cavalry in World War II.
 George F. Nafziger - Italian Order of Battle: An organizational history of the Italian Army in World War II (3 vol).
 John Joseph Timothy Sweet - Iron Arm: The Mechanization of Mussolini's Army, 1920–1940.

Cavalry divisions of Italy
Divisions of Italy in World War II
Military units and formations of Italy in Yugoslavia in World War II